{| class="toccolours" style="float: right; margin-left: 1em; font-size: 85%; background:#ffffcc; color:black; width:20em; max-width: 25%;" cellspacing="0" cellpadding="0"
! style="background-color:#cccccc;" | Office Bearers of the AELC
|-
| style="text-align: left;" |
 President Most.Rt.Rev.Dr.K.F.PARADESI BABU Vice-president Rev.Rev.K.V.PRASANNA KUMAR  
 Secretary: Mr  CHINNAM KISHORE BABU'
 Treasurer Mr.K.Moses Arnold

|}Andhra Evangelical Lutheran Church (AELC)' was constituted in the year 1927 in Andhra Pradesh, India.  It is the Indian successor to the United Lutheran Church in America which was started as a self-supporting, self-governing, and self-propagating church among Telugu Christians.

Memberships
 Andhra Christian Theological College, Hyderabad
 Lutheran World Federation (LWF), Geneva
 It is an affiliate member of the National Council of Churches in India (NCCI), Nagpur
 It is a member church in the United Evangelical Lutheran Churches in India (UELCI) – a communion of Lutheran Churches, Chennai 
 Asia Lutheran Communion

In India
Bartholomaeus Ziegenbalg and Heinrich Plütschau of the Danish-Halle Missionary Society at Tranquebar were the first Protestant Missionaries to India who were Lutherans.

In Andhra Pradesh
The AELC was founded as a mission field of the then General Synod of the Lutheran Church in America by John Christian Frederick Heyer (known as Father Heyer) on 31 July 1842.

As a first step, schools were established. With new baptisms, the confidence of the missionaries increased. Later hospitals were established.

Structures

 Theological
 Charlotte Swenson Memorial Bible Training School, Rajahmundry
 Andhra Lutheran Theological Seminary, Rajahmundry
 Andhra Christian Theological College, Hyderabad
 Medical
 Kugler Hospital, Guntur
 Ruth Sigmon Memorial Lutheran Hospital, Guntur
 Augustine Hospital, Bhimavaram
 Baer Christian Hospital, Chirala, Prakasam District
 Educational
 Andhra-Christian College, Guntur
 Andhra-Lutheran College, Guntur
 Stall School, Guntur
 Lutheran High School, Bhimavaram
 Shade Girls High School, Rajahmundry

Administration
The current Moderator / Bishop of the AELC is Most Rt.Rev.Dr.K.F.PARADESI BABU elected in the recent elections of the AELC, against  BY K. Fredrick Paradesi Babu.

For administrative purposes, six synods have been established, each taken care of by a Synod President. A 24-member Executive Council whose members are drawn from the six synods administers the Church society.

Moderator / Bishop
The Executive Council of this Church Society elects a set of office-bearers each quadrennium. The Moderator / Bishop heads this century-old Church Society.  In earlier nomenclature, the term President was used.  However, with the arrival of Rev. G. Emmanuel, the nomenclature was changed to Moderator / Bishop to denote a more ecclesiastical term. However, the term President also continues to be used.

Succession of Presidents

Women's ordination
For long, women's ordination in the AELC was taboo''.  One of the first theologically trained women of this Church, the Fuller Theological Seminary-educated Rev. Dr B. V. Subbamma could have been ordained long ago. But Church leaders, fearing her leadership kept the issue of women's ordination aside.

However, with sustained efforts and dialogue of Dr. K. Rajaratnam, Rev. Dr. Prasanna Kumari Samuel, and Dr. Monica J. Melanchton of the Gurukul Lutheran Theological College and Research Institute (GLTCRI), the dream of women's ordination became a reality. With the active cooperation of the then President, Bishop G. Emmanuel, seventeen women were ordained into pastoral ministry on 20 February 1999.

References

Further reading
 
 
 
 

Christianity in Andhra Pradesh
Lutheran World Federation members
Lutheranism in India
Christian organizations established in 1927
1927 establishments in British India
Lutheran denominations established in the 20th century
Affiliated institutions of the National Council of Churches in India